Thomas J. Balonek is a professor of physics and astronomy at Colgate University. He studies optical and radio emissions from galactic centers and quasars, and is a multiple discoverer of minor planets.

He is credited by the Minor Planet Center with the discovery of 9 minor planets made at Kitt Peak and Foggy Bottom Observatory during 1991–1995, respectively. His first discovery was the main-belt asteroid 6452 Johneuller in 1991.

His favorite sports are hockey and lacrosse, although he plays neither of them.

References

External links 
 Thomas Balonek at researchgate.net
 Thomas Balonek at colgate.edu

20th-century  American  astronomers
Discoverers of minor planets

Living people
Year of birth missing (living people)